Milan Petrović (Serbian Cyrillic: Милан Петровић, born 23 September 1976, in Belgrade, SFR Yugoslavia) is a Serbian keyboard player, songwriter and composer.

Discography

Solo / Milan Petrovic Quartet
The Best of 2011-2021
Year:2021
Emotions
Year:2018
Orient
Year:2017
Lady's touch
Year:2017
Dates 
Year:2016 
Live @ Nišville Jazz festival 2014 
Year:2015
High Voltage Studio Sessions Vol.2 Milan Petrović Quartet Live 
Year:2014
Favorites
Year: 2013
Excursion
Year: 2012
Label: SKCNS

with Del Arno Band
Retrospective
Year: 2001
Label: Automatik Records
Vreme Vode
Year: 2005
Label: Automatic Records

Guest appearances
Strah od petenja, Sabanoti (1995)
Dog Life,  Eyesburn (1998)
Prekidi Stvarnosti, Kanda, Kodža i Nebojša (2005)
Feeling Groovy,  Blue Family  (2009)
Homebound,  Ventolin  (2011)
Saw Friendly, Sonja Kalajić (2016)
Aftershock, Mario Rasic & Nebojša Buhin (2018)
Aja Sofija, Branko Isakovic (2018)
Otrovan, Elektromattik (2019)

External links
Official Site
interview B92.net
Jazzin.rs
tportal.hr
timemachinemusic.org
blic.rs
discogs.com

1976 births
Living people
Musicians from Belgrade
Serbian rock keyboardists
Serbian jazz musicians
Serbian blues keyboardists
Serbian jazz keyboardists
Serbian jazz bandleaders